The Port of Duqm, also known as Duqm Port, is a seaport and road terminal located at Duqm in the Al Wusta governorate of Oman. Overlooking the Arabian Sea and the Indian Ocean, the Port of Duqm is a joint-venture between ASYAD Ports and Consortium Antwerp Port. Although operating since , it was not officially opened until , by Mr. Asaad Bin Tariq Al Said, Deputy Prime Minister for International Relations and Cooperation Affairs and Personal Representative of His Majesty the Sultan of Oman.

International agreements
In August 2017, the Oman and the United Kingdom (UK) governments jointly established the UK Joint Logistics Support Base (UKJLSB) at Duqm Port.  The port has sufficient space and depth to berth the Royal Navy's latest Queen Elizabeth-class aircraft carriers.  In 2018, the port was used for Exercise Saif Sareea 3 (Exercise Swift Sword 3), a 10-day long, bilateral tri-service military exercise.  Also in 2018, the Indian government announced that it would use Duqm Port for maintenance of Indian military vessels.

In March 2019, the United States (U.S.) embassy announced an agreement for USA access to the ports at Salalah and Duqm.  In September 2020, the UK Defence Secretary announced a plan to triple the size of its UK Joint Logistics Support Base at the Omani port, with a further £23.8 million investment.

Dry dock
The dry dock complex, originally known as Oman Drydock Company, now known as Asyad Drydock, includes ship repair and maintenance facilities.  It was opened a year before the main port in 2011.  In 2021, the yard completed the build of its first ship, an Omani-owned logistics support ship.

See also
Duqm Airport
Duqm Refinery
Port of Antwerp-Bruges

References

External links

Port of Duqm — at ASYAD.om

Transport in Oman
Ports and harbours of Oman
2012 establishments in Oman